Marco Dezzi Bardeschi (September 30, 1934 – November 4, 2018) was an Italian architect. He was a professor of Architectural Restoration at the Polytechnic University of Milan. He authored several books, and he was the founding editor of ANANKE, an architectural magazine.

References

1934 births
2018 deaths
Architects from Florence
20th-century Italian architects
Academic staff of the Polytechnic University of Milan
21st-century Italian architects